

Champions

Major League Baseball

World Series: Philadelphia Phillies over Kansas City Royals (4–2); Mike Schmidt, MVP

American League Championship Series: Frank White, MVP
National League Championship Series Manny Trillo, MVP
All-Star Game, July 8 at Dodger Stadium: National League, 4–2; Ken Griffey, MVP

Other champions
Amateur World Series: Cuba
College World Series: Arizona
Japan Series: Hiroshima Toyo Carp over Kintetsu Buffaloes (4–3)
Big League World Series: Buena Park, California
Little League World Series: Long Kuong, Hua Lian, Taiwan
Senior League World Series: Pingtung, Taiwan
Winter Leagues
1980 Caribbean Series: Tigres del Licey
Dominican Republic League: Tigres del Licey
Mexican Pacific League: Naranjeros de Hermosillo
Puerto Rican League: Vaqueros de Bayamón
Venezuelan League: Leones del Caracas

Awards and honors
Baseball Hall of Fame
Al Kaline
Chuck Klein
Duke Snider
Tom Yawkey
Most Valuable Player
George Brett (AL) Kansas City Royals
Mike Schmidt (NL) Philadelphia Phillies
Cy Young Award
Steve Stone (AL) Baltimore Orioles
Steve Carlton (NL) Philadelphia Phillies
Rookie of the Year
Joe Charboneau (AL) Cleveland Indians
Steve Howe (NL) Los Angeles Dodgers
Woman Executive of the Year (major or minor league): Frances Crockett, Charlotte Orioles, Southern League
Gold Glove Award
Cecil Cooper (1B) (AL) 
Frank White (2B) (AL) 
Buddy Bell (3B) (AL) 
Alan Trammell (SS) (AL) 
Willie Wilson (OF) (AL) 
Fred Lynn (OF) (AL) 
Dwayne Murphy (OF) (AL)
Jim Sundberg (C) (AL) 
Mike Norris (P) (AL)

MLB statistical leaders

Major league baseball final standings

Events

January
January 4 - David Clyde, who'd made his MLB debut as a promising prospect as a teenager, returns to the Texas Rangers as he and outfielder Jim Norris are sent to Texas by the Cleveland Indians in exchange for outfielder Gary Gray, pitcher Larry McCall, and minor league infielder Mike Bucci.
January 5 - The Kansas City Royals sign pitcher Tom Candiotti.
January 9 – Al Kaline and Duke Snider are elected to the Hall of Fame by the Baseball Writers' Association of America. Kaline is the 10th player to be elected in his first year of eligibility, while Snider is making his 11th appearance on the ballot.
January 24 – The New York Mets are sold to a group headed by Nelson Doubleday, Jr. and Fred Wilpon for an estimated $21.1 million. It was, at the time, the highest amount ever paid for an American professional sports franchise.
 The New York Yankees sign outfielder Jim Nettles, the brother of Yankees third baseman Graig Nettles.
January 31 - Joe Morgan leaves the Cincinnati Reds and signs with the Houston Astros as  a free agent, returning to the city his major league career began.

February
February 12 – The Board of the Oakland Coliseum and the Oakland City Council both reject an attempt to buy out the remainder of the Oakland Athletics' lease to the stadium.  This blocks an attempt to sell the team and a possible move to Denver.
February 15 - The San Diego Padres acquire First baseman Willie Montanez from the Texas Rangers in exchange for infielder Tucker Ashford, minor leaguer Joe Carroll, and future hall of fame pitcher Gaylord Perry.

March
March 8 – Rookie Joe Charboneau of the Cleveland Indians is attacked outside a Mexico City hotel.  A fan seeking his autograph stabs him in the chest with a pen.  Charboneau misses the start of the year, but goes on to bat .289, hitting 23 home runs, while driving in 87 RBI in 131 games.  He will be elected American League Rookie of the Year.
March 10 - The New York Yankees sign pitcher Jose Cano. The 18 year old Cano plays only one season in the Yankees farm system before he is released and spends the next two seasons out of baseball. However, his son Robinson Cano would later go on to have an all-star career with the Yankees.
March 12 – Slugger Chuck Klein and former Boston Red Sox owner Tom Yawkey are elected to the Hall of Fame by the Special Veterans Committee. Yawkey is the first club owner selected who never served as a player, manager or general manager.
March 27 - The Los Angeles Dodgers give pitcher Ken Brett and catcher Johnny Oates their outright release. 
March 31 - Less than two months after he was traded back to Texas in hopes of reviving his career, David Clyde is released by the Rangers after he was continued to be plagued by arm troubles. This brings an end to Clyde's baseball career.
 The Texas Rangers trade outfielders Chris Smith and LaRue Washington to the Montreal Expos for Rusty Staub.

April
April 1 - The New York Yankees sign pitcher Jim Kaat
 The Chicago Cubs purchase the contract of Lenny Randle from the Seattle Mariners. 
April 3 - The San Francisco Giants release pitcher Pedro Borbon. 
April 4 - Bud Harrelson is released by the Philadelphia Phillies. 
April 9 - Two days before the start of the season, the uniforms belonging to the Durham Bulls are stolen. Hank Aaron, who was the minor league director for the Bulls parent club, the Atlanta Braves, sends the bulls some used Braves road jerseys to tide them over until their uniforms can be replaced.
 Starting opening day for the Seattle Mariners, Mike Parrott gets the win in Seattle's 8–6 win over the Toronto Blue Jays. It would be Parrott's only win of the year as he finished the season 1-16
April 10 – Right Fielder Sixto Lezcano blasts a grand slam home run for the Milwaukee Brewers against the Boston Red Sox on Opening Day in the bottom of the 9th Inning to win the game, making him the first player to accomplish this feat in two straight years. Lezcano also hit a grand slam two years prior on Opening Day.
 After Texas Rangers starter Jon Matlack and New York Yankees starter Ron Guidry each pitch nine inning out shut out baseball, the Rangers win 1–0 in the 12th inning after Goose Gossage, in his only pitch of the game, throws a wild pitch with Richie Zisk at the plate. The wild pitch allows Ranger base runner (and former Yankee) Mickey Rivers to score from third. 
April 12 – Newly acquired Nolan Ryan makes his first National League start since 1971 for the Houston Astros, bats in a game for the first time since 1972, and belts his first career home run, a three-run shot, in the fourth inning off Don Sutton of the Los Angeles Dodgers.  Ryan, however, only lasts six innings and the Dodgers win the game 6–5 in 17 innings at the Astrodome.
April 22 – In a classic slugfest at Wrigley Field, the Chicago Cubs beat the St. Louis Cardinals, 16–12, on a two-out grand slam by Barry Foote off reliever Mark Littell in the bottom of the ninth inning. Foote drove in eight runs overall with four hits and two homers, while teammate Iván de Jesús went 5-for-6 and hit for the cycle to help Chicago rally from an early 12–5 deficit.
April 26 - Steve Carlton throws a one-hitter to lead the Philadelphia Phillies over the St. Louis Cardinals. This is the sixth one hit game Carlton, who never threw a no hitter in his 24-year career, had thrown. 
April 30 - The St. Louis Cardinals purchase the contract of Jim Kaat from the New York Yankees.

May
May 1 - New York Mets starting pitcher Pete Falcone strikes out the first six batters he faces in a game versus the Philadelphia Phillies. Falcone strikes out Lonnie Smith, Pete Rose. Garry Maddox, Mike Schmidt, Greg Luzinski, and Bob Boone. The seventh batter, shortstop Larry Bowa grounded out. Despite the success early, the Mets fall to Philadelphia 2–1.
May 3 – Willie McCovey of the San Francisco Giants hits what will be the last of his 521 career home runs, off Scott Sanderson of the Montreal Expos, in the fourth inning of the Giants' 3–2 victory over the Expos at Olympic Stadium. McCovey becomes the second player, after Ted Williams (who also retired with 521 career home runs), to hit a home run in four different decades.
 Ferguson Jenkins becomes the fifth pitcher in major league history to win 100 games in both the NL and AL when he gets the decision in a 3–2 win over the Baltimore Orioles. He joined Al Orth, Cy Young, Jim Bunning and Gaylord Perry in the exclusive club.
May 5 - Bill Madlock of the Pittsburgh Pirates is fined $5,000 and suspended for 15 days by NL president Chub Fenney. Madlock had shoved his glove in the face of umpire Gerry Crawford over a call in a game against the Montreal Expos four days earlier. 
May 7 - The Texas Rangers signed Bud Harrelson.
May 11 - Pete Rose of the Philadelphia Phillies steals Second base, third base, and home plate in the Phillies 7–3 win over the Cincinnati Reds. Rose was the first player since Harvey Hendrick of the Pittsburgh Pirates in 1928 to pull off the stolen base cycle in one inning.  
May 23 – Texas Rangers pitcher Ferguson Jenkins wins his 250th game against the Oakland Athletics. Jenkins pitched a complete game for the Rangers, striking out eight batters in the victory.
 In the early hours of the morning, the MLBPA and the owners reach a preliminary agreement, preventing a walk out by the players. However, the topic of free agency is tabled, an act that would lead to the players 50 day strike the following season.
May 27 - The St. Louis Cardinals release pitcher Pedro Borbon and outfielder Bernie Carbo.
May 28 - Isao Harimoto of the Lotte Orions collects his 3,000 career hit. Harimoto will finish his career with 3,085 hits. 
May 29 – At San Diego Stadium, Johnny Bench of the Cincinnati Reds breaks Yogi Berra's all-time record for home runs by a catcher. He hits two home runs off Randy Jones in the Reds' 5–3 victory over the San Diego Padres; the first comes in the second inning and gives him 336 on his career and 306 as a catcher, breaking a tie he had shared with Berra.

June
June 3 - The June MLB player draft is held. Notable selections in the first round are Kelly Gruber, who'd go on to win a gold glove with the Toronto Blue Jays, who is drafted by the Cleveland Indians, the Montreal Expos take first baseman Terry Francona with the 22nd pick, and Darryl Strawberry by the New York Mets.
June 4 - Jim Kaat, recently acquired by the St. Louis Cardinals from the New York Yankees, pitches 10 shut out innings against the New York Mets. The Cardinals win, despite a strong showing from Mets pitchers Pat Zachry  and Neil Allen. The Cardinals get the 1–0 win thanks in part to an extra innings home run by infielder Ken Reitz.
June 5 - At Shea Stadium, Mike Jorgensen's bases-loaded single in the ninth inning drove in Steve Henderson to give Craig Swan and the New York Mets a 2-1 victory over The St Louis Cardinals.
June 6 - Houston's J.R. Richard struck out 13 batters to highlight a three-hitter and Art Howe and Terry Puhl each got three hits to lead the Astros to a 2-0 victory over The San Francisco Giants.
June 7 - Ron Hodges' pinch single capped a two-run 11th Inning rally that carried the New York Mets to a 6-5 victory, their second straight over the reigning world champions Pittsburgh Pirates.
June 8 - A Sunday doubleheader saw the Mets and the Pirates split both games. Game 1 saw the Mets beat the Pirates 6-4 and Game 2 saw the Pirates beat the Mets 3-0, but the real story was that 29,329 fans showed up for the doubleheader, the largest Shea Stadium crowd since August 20,1978.
June 16 - Tim Foli drove in three runs and struggling Bert Blyleven earned the 150th pitching victory of his career to lead the Pittsburgh Pirates to a 5-3 win over the Cincinnati Reds that was seen on ABC's Monday Night Baseball.
June 17 - The Cleveland Indians are forced to close off a portion of the stadium due to rowdy fans pelting Brewers outfielders Gorman Thomas and Sixto Lezcano in a loss to the Brewers =the previous day. The portion of the stadium would not re-open until more security had been hired later that month.
June 20 – California Angels shortstop Freddie Patek hits three home runs and collects seven RBIs in the Angels' 20–2 victory over the Boston Red Sox at Fenway Park.
 In a bizarre moment, Detroit Tigers Al Cowens hits a slow roller off White Sox pitcher Ed Farmer. Instead of running towards first, Cowens runs and attacks Farmer as revenge for being hit by a pitcher from Farmer the previous season, which broke Cowens jaw and cost him to miss 21 games as a member of the Kansas City Royals. An arrest warrant is issued for Cowens, which forces him to miss the rest of the series. Cowens is later suspended for a week by the AL. 
June 25 - The San Francisco Giants' Mike Ivie abruptly announces his retirement from baseball, citing depression.  Ivie would return to the Giants three weeks later, convinced by a phone call from teammate Willie McCovey.
June 27 – At Candlestick Park, Jerry Reuss of the Los Angeles Dodgers no-hits the San Francisco Giants 8–0. A Bill Russell error on Jack Clark's first-inning ground ball is the only baserunner Reuss allows.

July
July 1 - The New York Yankees release outfielder Paul Blair. 
July 3 – Minnesota Twins outfielder Ken Landreaux ties an American League record in hitting three triples during a win over the Texas Rangers. Earlier this season, Landreaux set the Twins club record with a 31-game hitting streak, a record that still stands thirty-five years later.
July 4
Houston Astros pitcher Nolan Ryan strikes out César Gerónimo of the Cincinnati Reds, to become the fourth major league pitcher ever to reach 3,000 career strikeouts. Gerónimo was also Bob Gibson's 3,000th career strikeout victim six years earlier. Despite the milestone, Ryan allows six runs in 4.1 innings and Houston loses, 8–1.
During the first-ever fireworks night hosted at Shea Stadium, Montreal Expos Rookie Bill Gullickson sailed a pitch over New York Mets first baseman Mike Jorgensen's head in the second game of a doubleheader. Jorgensen did not appreciate this as he had been the victim of one of the worst beanball injuries in baseball history the previous season with the Texas Rangers, and motioned toward Gullickson his disapproval. Mets catcher John Stearns, who was not even in the line-up for this game, charged out of the dugout and welcomed Gullickson to the majors by slamming him to the ground.
July 6 – Philadelphia Phillies pitcher Steve Carlton becomes the major leagues' left-handed strikeout king, fanning seven Cardinals in an 8–3 Phillies win to bring his career total to 2,836. Mickey Lolich had held the record with 2,832.
July 8 – At Dodger Stadium, the National League battles back to win its ninth consecutive All-Star Game over the American League, 4–2. Ken Griffey goes 2-for-3 with a solo home run to win the MVP honors.
July 11 - The Los Angeles Dodgers sell the contract of pitcher Charlie Hough to the Texas Rangers.
July 18 - The New York Mets play their 3,000 game, falling 8–3 in the second game of a double header against the Cincinnati Reds. 
July 19 - Roy Lee Jackson of the New York Mets retires the last 19 hitters he faced in the Mets 13–3 win over the Cincinnati Reds. 
July 25 - Mike Schmidt passes Del Ennis to become the franchise leader in home runs. 
July 27 - Three days after he is released by the Atlanta Braves, pitcher Terry Leach is signed by the New York Mets. Leach would go on to be a key player in the Mets World Series win over the Boston Red Sox in 1986.  
July 30 – Houston Astros pitcher J. R. Richard suffers a stroke during his first attempt to pitch since being hospitalized for tests weeks earlier.  He would not play again.

August
August 1 - The New York Yankees sign 15 year old pitching prospect José Rijo as an undrafted amateur free agent. 
August 4 - The Seattle Mariners fired manager Darrell Johnson, and replace him with Maury Wills. This is the first managerial change in franchise history for the Mariners
August 5 - Chicago Cubs rookie shortstop Steve Macko suffers a bad bruise in a collision with the Pittsburgh Pirates' Bill Madlock in the first game of a doubleheader.  A hurting Macko drives in a run with a double, is pinch-run for by Rick Reuschel, and never plays another game in the majors.  Doctors examining Macko diagnose him with testicular cancer, and Macko would pass away in November 1981.
August 11 - Reggie Jackson of the New York Yankees hits his 400th career home run of Britt Burns of the Chicago White Sox. 
 The Kansas City Royals sign pitcher Ken Brett, re-uniting him with his brother, Royals Third baseman George Brett.
August 12 - Nearly 50,000 fans cram into Tiger Stadium to watch former Tigers ace Mark Fidrych attempt a comeback. Boston won the game 5–2, and Fidrych's days in the majors begin to come to an end. 
August 17 - The Detroit Tigers hold a ceremony in which they retire the number 6 in honor of former star Al Kaline. Kaline becomes the first player in Tigers history to have his uniform number retired. 
August 20 - Chicago White Sox outfielder Leo Sutherland gets a single off Indians pitcher Dan Spillner. The hit breaks up Spilner's no-hit bid. He then retires the next two batters as Cleveland gets the 3–0 victory. 
August 21 - Oakland A's owner Charlie Finley announces the sale of the team to Walter Haas, Jr, a move that assures the team will stay in Oakland. Oil tycoon Marvin Davis had wanted to purchase the team and move then to Denver Colorado. 
August 24 - Gene Mauch resigns as manager of the Minnesota Twins and third base coach John Goryl takes over. The Twins, who were 26 games out of first place, win 23 of the remaining 36 games of the season. 
August 26 - George Brett of the Kansas City Royals goes 5-5 as the Royals defeat the Milwaukee Brewers. Brett's day raises his batting average to .407.
August 27 – The Philadelphia Phillies' Steve Carlton becomes the first National League pitcher to win twenty games this season, combining with Tug McGraw to beat the Los Angeles Dodgers, 4–3. Carlton will win a National League-high 24 games, while pitching 304 innings, the last MLB pitcher to throw more than 300 innings in a season.

September
September 1 - Wade Boggs, playing for the Pawtucket Red Sox, loses the batting title on the last day of the season. Pawtucket is playing the Toledo Mud Hens, who force Boggs' last at-bat by walking the light hitting Ray Boyer. The Mud Hens, who led the game 6–0, allow Boyer to take bases at will. Boggs ends up grounding out to first to end the game, thus lowering his average. He finished the season .0007 points behind Dave Engle, who just happened to play for the Toledo Mud Hens. 
 Ed Farmer, who'd been assaulted during a game by Al Cowens earlier in the season, agrees to drop the charges. Before the game, both men brought the line-up cards to the home plate umpire, and later shook hands. The fans weren't as forgiving, as they booed Cowens every time he came to bat.
September 4 - Hubie Brooks makes his MLB debut, going hitless in three at bats in the Mets 3-2 loss to the San Diego Padres.
September 8 - Commissioner Bowie Kuhn suspends pitcher Ferguson Jenkins following Jenkins' drug arrest. An Arbiter later re-instates Jenkins. 
 The Philadelphia Phillies sign free agent catcher Tim McCarver in what would be McCarver's final season as a pro. 
September 10 – Bill Gullickson strikes out 18, the most by a major league rookie pitcher, as the Montréal Expos beat the Chicago Cubs 4–2.
September 13 - The Texas Rangers trade pitcher Sparky Lyle to the Philadelphia Phillies for a player named later. The player named later is pitcher Kevin Saucier. 
September 18 – Gary Ward hit for the cycle in a 9-8 Minnesota Twins loss to Milwaukee. He did it in only the 14th game of his career, which still stands as the major league record for fewest games played before first hitting for the cycle.
September 19 - The Kansas City Royals rout the visiting Oakland A's, 13–3. George Brett gets two hits to keep his average above .400, marking the latest in a season that a player was hitting at or above .400 since Ted Williams in 1941.
September 20 – George Brett goes 0-for-4 dropping his batting average below .400. Only Tony Gwynn will come closer than that before the 20th century ends.
 A bronze plaque dedicated to Thurman Munson, who died unexpectedly the previous season in a plane crash, is unveiled in the team's monument park.
September 24 – The Atlanta Braves reach the 1,000,000 mark in attendance. It marks the first time that every National League team has drawn at least 1,000,000 fans for a season.
September 25 - In an extra innings loss to the Cincinnati Reds. Ozzie Smith and Jerry Mumphrey each steal a base, making the Padres the first team ever with three players who stole more than 5 bases. Gene Richard, who lead the team with 61 swipes, was the other. 
 Brian Kingman of the Oakland A's loses his 20th game of the season. The loss made Kingman the first 20-game loser in the majors since Dolf Luque of the Cincinnati reds in 1922.  
September 28 - Before an ABC National television audience, the Montreal Expos beat the Philadelphia Phillies, 8–3 to take a half-game lead in the National League East. Steve Rogers picked up his 16th win of the season while Gary Carter was the offensive hero for the Expos as he went 3-for-4 including 2 home runs. His great day would put him on the cover of Sports Illustrated the following week.
September 30 - The New York Mets defeat the Pittsburgh Pirates 3–2 at Shea Stadium. Only 1,754 fans showed up, making it the smallest crowd to ever attend a game at Shea.

October
October 1 - The Boston Red Sox fire manager Don Zimmer due to pressure from fans, who never forgave Zimmer for the late season collapse in 1978, who led to the one game play off in which Bucky Dent hit the game-winning home run for the Yankees over the green monster.
October 4 – In a 17–1 rout of the Minnesota Twins, Willie Wilson of the Kansas City Royals becomes the first major league player ever to be credited with 700 at-bats in a single season, and ends the year with 705 at bats.
October 4 – Philadelphia's Mike Schmidt hits a 2-run home run in the top of the 11th inning to give the Phillies a 6–4 win over the Montreal Expos at Olympic Stadium, clinching the National League East title.
October 5 – On October 3, the Los Angeles Dodgers had been down three games to the Houston Astros to tie for the National League West Division title.  Needing a sweep of the Astros, the Dodgers complete just such a sweep today;  each of the wins by a single run.  They will play a one-game playoff tomorrow.
 Ben Oglivie, who was born in Panama,  of the Milwaukee Brewers hits a home run off the A's Rick Langford, tying him with Reggie Jackson, and making Oglivie the first player not born in America to lead the AL in hom runs. 
October 6 – After suffering through the three-game sweep of the Los Angeles Dodgers the last three days, Joe Niekro wins his twentieth game of the season to earn a win for the Houston Astros, 7–1, in a one-game playoff. It is the Astros' first Division Title.
October 9 – The Kansas City Royals win Game 2 of the 1980 ALCS 3–2, but the game is remembered for the top of the eighth inning.  With Willie Randolph on first with two outs, Bob Watson lines a double to left.  Yankee third base coach Mike Ferraro waves Randolph home, and the Royals gun him down at the plate. With a national television audience looking on, Yankee owner George Steinbrenner is shown in the stands on ABC game cameras shouting Ferraro's name at general manager Gene Michael.  Steinbrenner ordered Yankee manager Dick Howser to fire Ferraro on the spot right after the game, but Howser refused.
Kansas City won the pennant in, of all places, Yankee Stadium. After the game, Dick Howser resigns as Yankee manager over the events in Game 2 involving Mike Ferraro as described above.
 October 12 – The Philadelphia Phillies capture their first pennant since  with a 10-inning, 8–7 win over the Houston Astros at the Astrodome, in the fifth and final game of the NL Championship Series. Each of the last four games was decided in extra innings. The Phillies, down by three runs to Nolan Ryan in the 8th inning, rally and go ahead on Garry Maddox's double in the 10th inning.
 October 21 – The Philadelphia Phillies win the World Series, the first WS Championship in their 98-year history, by beating the Kansas City Royals, 4–1, in Game Six. Steve Carlton earns the win, though the most memorable moment may be Tug McGraw on the mound jumping for joy as he earns the save after loading the bases with no outs. Another equally memorable moment comes with one out in the bottom of the ninth when Frank White's pop-up is bobbled by Bob Boone, only to be tipped into the glove of Pete Rose. Philadelphia's Mike Schmidt is named MVP, hitting .381 with two home runs and seven RBI, while KC's Willie Wilson is the "goat", striking out a WS-record 12 times, including the final out of the Series with the bases loaded, and hitting only .154.
October 22 - Dave Winfield of the San Diego Padres is officially declared a free agent. 
October 26 - Ralph Houk comes out of retirement to become manager of the Boston Red Sox.

November
November 3 
An era ends for the Oakland Athletics as the sale of the team is finalized.  The flamboyant Charlie O. Finley sells the team to Walter A. Haas, ending his relationship with the team.
George Brett was named the Sporting News American League Player of the Year. Steve Stone was named the Sporting News American League Pitcher of the Year. Steve Carlton was named the Sporting News National League Pitcher of the year and his teammate Mike Schmidt was named National League Player of the Year by the Sporting News..
November 4 – Sadaharu Oh announces his retirement as a player from Japanese baseball. His 868 documented career home runs remain an unapproached world record among professional baseball players.
November 12:
Baltimore Orioles pitcher Steve Stone, who led the American League with 25 victories, wins the Cy Young Award over Mike Norris of the Oakland Athletics.
Don Zimmer is named manager of the Texas Rangers, becoming the 10th manager in the club's nine-year history.
November 18 - Brad Gulden is traded for himself. The New York Yankees trade Gulden to the Seattle Mariners for veteran infielder Larry Milbourne and a player named later. In May 1981, Gulden is sent back to the Yankees as the player to be named later, officially making Gulden the first player since Harry Chiti to be traded for himself. 
November 25 – Gene Michael becomes the 25th manager in New York Yankees history, replacing a fired Dick Howser, who led the team to the American League East title with a 103–59 mark.
November 26 – Philadelphia Phillies third baseman Mike Schmidt, who hit .286 with career highs of 48 home runs and 121 RBI, is a unanimous choice as National League Most Valuable Player.

December
December 1 – Los Angeles Dodgers relief pitcher Steve Howe wins the National League Rookie of the Year Award, edging Montréal Expos starting pitcher Bill Gullickson and outfielder Lonnie Smith of the Philadelphia Phillies. Howe posted a 7–9 record with a 2.65 ERA and 17 saves.
December 8 - In one of the largest trades ever at the annual winter meetings, the San Diego Padres sent catcher Bob Geren, pitchers Rollie Fingers, Bob Shirley and first baseman Gene Tenace to the St. Louis Cardinals in exchange for catchers Terry Kennedy and Steve Swisher, pitchers John Littlefield, Al Olmsted, John Urrea, Kim Seaman, and infielder Mike Phillips. Fingers never appears in a Cardinals uniform as he is traded again days later to the Milwaukee Brewers.
December 9 – The Chicago Cubs send relief pitcher Bruce Sutter to their arch-rivals, the St. Louis Cardinals, in exchange for first baseman Leon Durham. Sutter will go on to save many more games for the Cardinals, while Durham's critical error in Game 5 of the 1984 NLCS will doom the Cubs.
December 10 - The Detroit Tigers acquire pitcher Kevin Saucier from the Texas Rangers in exchange for shortstop Mark Wagner. Saucier would later become infamous for developing the "Yips" an informal term for players, typically pitchers and catcher, who cannot control the direction of the ball they are throwing. 
December 12 – The St. Louis Cardinals trade future Hall of Fame closer Rollie Fingers, All star catcher Ted Simmons and pitcher Pete Vuckovich to the Milwaukee Brewers for pitchers Dave LaPoint and Lary Sorensen and outfielders David Green and Sixto Lezcano.
December 15 - Dave Winfield signs a 10-year 16 million dollar contract with the New York Yankees. This makes Winfield the richest athlete in pro sports at the time and signals the end of Reggie Jackson's days in pinstripes as George Steinbrenner informs Jackson his free agent option will not be picked up once his current contract ends. 
December 16 - The New York Mets sign Rusty Staub as a free agent. 
December 17 - The San Diego Padres sign infielder Ozzie Guillen as an undrafted free agent. 
December 20 - The Boston Red Sox missed the deadline to tender contracts to pending free agents. The blunder officially makes catcher Carlton Fisk and outfielder Fred Lynn free agents. This blunder cost Boston both players as Fisk signs with the Chicago White Sox and Lynn signs with the California Angels.
December 22 - The Yomiuri Giants purchase the contract of outfielder Gary Thomasson from the Los Angeles Dodgers.
 The St. Louis Cardinals release outfielder Bobby Bonds.

Births

January
January 3 – Brad Salmon
January 10 – Matt Roney
January 12 – Bobby Crosby
January 15 – JD Closser
January 15 – Matt Holliday
January 16 – Brooks Conrad
January 16 – Albert Pujols
January 17 – T. J. Bohn
January 17 – Mike Rabelo
January 20 – Franklyn Germán
January 20 – Luis Martínez
January 25 – Phil Stockman
January 26 – Brandon Medders
January 26 – Antonio Pérez

February

February 1 – Héctor Luna
February 3 – Skip Schumaker
February 4 – Steve Schmoll
February 4 – Doug Slaten
February 7 – Brad Hennessey
February 10 – César Izturis
February 11 – Matt Lindstrom
February 12 – Adam Stern
February 13 – Drew Henson
February 15 – Don Kelly
February 18 – Walter Young
February 20 – Ryan Langerhans
February 22 – Ramón Nivar
February 26 – Gary Majewski
February 27 – John Hattig

March
March 1 – Micah Hoffpauir
March 4 – Jack Hannahan
March 7 – Scott Munter
March 11 – Chris Burke
March 11 – Rich Hill
March 11 – Dan Uggla
March 13 – Byron Gettis
March 15 – Freddie Bynum
March 25 – Neal Cotts
March 31 – Chien-Ming Wang

April
April 3 – Justin Christian
April 7 – Vinny Rottino
April 9 – Ryan O'Malley
April 11 – Mark Teixeira
April 12 – Danny García
April 13 – Joselo Díaz
April 14 – John Van Benschoten
April 15 – Yoel Hernández
April 17 – Max St. Pierre
April 20 – Chris Duffy
April 21 – Jeff Keppinger
April 22 – Carlos Hernández
April 23 – Yosuke Hiraishi
April 25 – Mike Rouse
April 25 – Kazuhito Tadano
April 26 – Mike Wood
April 29 – Kelly Shoppach
April 30 – Mark Saccomanno

May
May 5 – Chad Bentz
May 8 – Jason Davis
May 10 – Craig Brazell
May 11 – Roy Corcoran
May 12 – Felipe López
May 15 – Josh Beckett
May 18 – Juan Domínguez
May 18 – Luis Terrero
May 20 – Austin Kearns
May 22 – Ruddy Lugo
May 22 – Chad Tracy
May 24 – Justin Hampson
May 25 – Scott Hairston
May 26 – Sean Barker
May 29 – Cha Seung Baek

June
June 3 – Tjerk Smeets 
June 6 – Matt Belisle
June 9 – Mike Fontenot
June 10 – Jeff Bennett
June 11 – Yhency Brazobán
June 15 - Erik Kratz
June 16 – Dewon Brazelton
June 18 – Tommy Watkins
June 21 – Sendy Rleal
June 22 – Luis Maza
June 24 – Doug Bernier
June 26 – Chris Shelton
June 27 – Luis Rodríguez
June 30 – Todd Linden

July
July 1 – Nelson Cruz
July 2 – Nyjer Morgan
July 2 – Jermaine Van Buren
July 3 – John Koronka
July 7 – John Buck
July 10 – Jesse Foppert
July 12 – Brad Eldred
July 15 – Reggie Abercrombie
July 15 – Jung Bong
July 15 – Chris Denorfia
July 15 – Nick Neugebauer
July 17 – Justin Knoedler
July 21 – Kyuji Fujikawa
July 21 – CC Sabathia
July 23 – Dallas McPherson
July 25 – Santiago Casilla
July 25 – Shawn Riggans
July 26 – Jason Botts
July 27 – Félix Díaz
July 29 – Ryan Braun
July 30 – Edwin Moreno

August

August 6 – Mark Ripperger
August 8 – Craig Breslow
August 8 – Jack Cassel
August 11 – Kurt Birkins
August 13 – Jonah Bayliss
August 15 – Mel Stocker
August 16 – Ryan Hanigan
August 16 – Ben Kozlowski
August 17 – Brett Myers
August 17 – Michael O'Connor
August 17 – Jeff Ridgway
August 17 – Chris Waters
August 18 – Jason Perry
August 19 – Lance Cormier
August 23 – Denny Bautista
August 23 – Marcus McBeth
August 23 – Pat Strange
August 24 – Kevin Correia
August 25 – Neal Musser
August 26 – Brendan Harris
August 28 – T. J. Beam
August 28 – Ryan Madson
August 30 – Russ Adams
August 30 – Roberto Hernández

September
September 4 – Pat Neshek
September 7 – Mark Prior
September 9 – Todd Coffey
September 11 – Matt DeSalvo
September 12 – Sean Burroughs
September 12 – Maicer Izturis
September 12 – Kevin Richardson
September 13 – Daisuke Matsuzaka
September 17 – Danny Haren
September 19 – Ryan Roberts
September 19 – Ray Sadler
September 23 – Mike Gosling
September 24 – Levale Speigner
September 28 – Chris Demaria
September 28 – Francisco Rosario
September 29 – Miguel Asencio
September 29 – Dewon Day
September 30 – Bryan Bullington

October
October 1 – Chad Orvella
October 9 – Mark McLemore
October 10 – Noah Lowry
October 18 – Shane Komine
October 19 – José Bautista
October 19 – Rajai Davis
October 20 – José Veras
October 21 – Troy Cate
October 21 – Jon Coutlangus
October 23 – Pedro Liriano
October 25 – Clint Nageotte
October 27 – Kelvin Jiménez
October 30 – Mike Jacobs
October 30 – Laynce Nix
October 30 – Toshiya Sugiuchi
October 31 – Jeff Albert

November
November 6 – Mike Thompson
November 8 – Víctor Marte
November 14 – Sean Tracey
November 18 – C. J. Wilson
November 21 – Hank Blalock
November 22 – Jonny Gomes
November 23 – Jonathan Papelbon
November 24 – Jeff Salazar
November 25 – Nick Swisher
November 29 – Brian Wolfe
November 30 – Shane Victorino

December
December 2 – Eric Reed
December 4 – Gustavo Chacín
December 6 – Ehren Wassermann
December 9 – Fred Lewis
December 11 – Joe Blanton
December 16 – Josh Hall
December 17 – Dale Thayer
December 20 – Luke Carlin
December 21 – Royce Ring
December 22 – Reid Gorecki
December 23 – Cody Ross
December 27 – Jason Repko
December 31 – Jesse Carlson

Deaths

January
January 2 – Kenny Hogan, 77, pinch runner and outfielder who played four MLB games during brief trials with 1921 Cincinnati Reds and 1923–1924 Cleveland Indians.
January 2 – George Lees, 84, catcher in 20 games for 1921 Chicago White Sox.
January 3 – Bob Geary, 88, pitcher in 35 total games for 1918–1919 Philadelphia Athletics and 1921 Cincinnati Reds.
January 4 – Foster Edwards, 76, pitcher who appeared in 56 games for the 1925–1928 Boston Braves and 1930 New York Yankees.
January 6 – June Gilmore, 57, All-American Girls Professional Baseball League player.
January 8 – Harvey Russell, 92, catcher and pinch hitter who appeared in 134 career games for the 1914–1915 Baltimore Terrapins of the "outlaw" Federal League.
January 10 – Hughie Critz, 79, second baseman for the Cincinnati Reds and New York Giants who led NL in fielding four times and double plays three times.
January 13 – Charlie Sproull, 61, pitcher who posted a 4–10 won–lost record (5.94 ERA) in 34 games for the wartime 1945 Philadelphia Phillies.
January 21 – Clyde Barnhart, 84, Pittsburgh Pirates left fielder and third baseman (1920–1928); member of 1925 world champions whose 114 regular-season runs batted in, and five World Series RBI, helped lead Bucs to the title.
January 21 – Gene Rye, 73, outfielder for the 1931 Boston Red Sox.
January 24 – Buck Etchison, 64, first baseman and pinch hitter who appeared in 119 games for the 1943–1944 Boston Braves.
January 26 – Napoleon Hairston, 67, outfielder for the 1938 Pittsburgh Crawfords of the Negro National League.
January 26 – Frank Rosso, 58, who pitched in two games for the New York Giants in the closing days of the wartime 1944 season.
January 31 – Ed Head, 62, pitcher who compiled a 27–23 won–lost mark with the Brooklyn Dodgers in 118 games spanning five seasons between 1940 and 1946.

February
February 1 – Greg Mulleavy, 74, shortstop who played in 78 games for the Chicago White Sox (1930 and 1932) and in one contest for the Red Sox (1933); later, coached for Brooklyn/Los Angeles Dodgers between 1957 and 1964 and served as a longtime Dodger scout.
February 1 – Fred Walters, 67, catcher for the 1945 Boston Red Sox, and one of many players who only appeared in the majors during World War II.
February 2 – Jack Rothrock, 74, center fielder for four different teams from 1925 to 1937, who led the victorious St. Louis Cardinals with six RBI in the 1934 World Series.
February 4 – Dud Branom, 82, first baseman who played in 30 games for the 1927 Philadelphia Athletics.
February 14 – Jelly Jackson, 70, shortstop/second baseman for the Cleveland Red Sox (1934) and Homestead Grays (1935–1940, 1944–1945) of the Negro National League.

March
March 1 – Emmett Ashford, 65, the major leagues' first black umpire, who worked in the American League from 1966 to 1970 and in the 1970 World Series.
March 1 – Art Jorgens, 74, Norwegian-born backup catcher for the New York Yankees who played 11 seasons (1929–1939) behind Hall of Famer Bill Dickey; member of five World Series championship teams but never once appeared in a Fall Classic. 
March 1 – Johnny Watwood, 74, center fielder and first baseman who played in 469 games between 1929 and 1939 for the Chicago White Sox, Boston Red Sox and Philadelphia Phillies.
March 3 – Jerry Priddy, 60, second baseman who played from 1941 to 1953 for the New York Yankees, Washington Senators, St. Louis Browns and Detroit Tigers.
March 5 – Les Fleming, 64, first baseman and outfielder who appeared in 434 games for the Cleveland Indians (1939, 1941–1942 and 1945–1947) and Pittsburgh Pirates (1949). 
March 9 – Tom Baker, 45, left-hander who pitched in ten games for the 1963 Chicago Cubs.
March 11 – Stan Klopp, 69, relief pitcher who appeared in 24 games for the wartime-era 1944 Boston Braves.
March 14 – Al Wickland, 92, outfielder/pinch hitter in 444 games for five teams in three leagues (largely for Chicago and Pittsburgh of the "outlaw" Federal League) from 1913–1915 and in 1918–1919.
March 17 – Bob Hooper, 57, Canadian-born pitcher who worked in 194 games for the Philadelphia Athletics, Cleveland Indians and Cincinnati Redlegs from 1950 to 1955.
March 22 – Ray Foley, 73, pitch hitter in two games for the 1928 New York Giants.
March 27 – Lou Knerr, 58, pitcher for 1945–1946 Philadelphia Athletics and 1947 Washington Senators; co-led American League hurlers in games lost (16) in 1946.

April
April 3 – Bob Linton, 77, catcher/pinch hitter who appeared in 17 games for the 1929 Pittsburgh Pirates.
April 3 – Bob Trowbridge, 49, pitcher who hurled in 116 games for the 1956–1959 Milwaukee Braves and 1960 Kansas City Athletics; member of 1957 World Series champions.
April 7 – Buck Canel, 74, Spanish-language broadcaster of 42 World Series, as well as many years of New York Yankees games.
April 9 – Ed Morgan, 75, first baseman and right fielder for the 1928–1933 Cleveland Indians and 1934 Boston Red Sox; batted .313 in 771 games and drove in 136 runs in 1930, sixth in the American League.
April 12 – Mel Preibisch, 65, outfielder who got into 16 games for Boston Bees/Braves of 1940–1941; later a scout.
April 17 – Hooks Iott, 60, left-handed pitcher and 16-year veteran of the minors who appeared in 26 games during two MLB seasons as a member of the St. Louis Browns (1941 and 1947) and New York Giants (1947).
April 17 – Ed Miller, 91, first baseman and pinch hitter who played in 86 career games for the Browns (1912, 1914) and Cleveland Indians (1918).
April 19 – Sid Gautreaux, 67, catcher and pinch hitter in 86 games for the 1936–1937 Brooklyn Dodgers.
April 21 – Ray Dobens, 73, pitcher in 11 games for the 1929 Boston Red Sox.
April 21 – Joe Page, 62, three-time All-Star southpaw relief pitcher for the New York Yankees (1944–1950) who set single-season record with 27 saves in 1949, and led AL in saves and appearances twice each; two-time (1947, 1949) world champion and 1949 World Series MVP.
April 24 – Dink Mothell, 82, catcher/second baseman/utility man who played all nine positions during his Negro leagues career (1920 to 1932); stalwart member of 1920s Kansas City Monarchs.
April 24 – Beryl Richmond, 72, left-handed hurler who worked in ten total games for the 1933 Chicago Cubs and 1934 Cincinnati Reds.
April 25 – Cliff Lee, 83, outfielder and .300 lifetime hitter who played in 521 games from 1919–1926 for four clubs, principally the Philadelphia Phillies.
April 28 – Bob Porterfield, 56, All-Star and The Sporting News AL Pitcher of the Year in 1953 after a 22–10 season with the Washington Senators; also pitched for New York Yankees, Boston Red Sox, Pittsburgh Pirates and Chicago Cubs over his 12-year (1948–1959) career.
April 27 – Rube Ehrhardt, 85, relief pitcher who worked in 193 games for the Brooklyn Robins and Cincinnati Reds between 1924 and 1929.

May
May 1 – George Woodend, 62, relief pitcher who appeared in three early-season contests for the 1944 Boston Braves.
May 6 – Harry Sweeney, 64, World War II-era first baseman who appeared in one MLB game, on October 1, 1944, for the Pittsburgh Pirates.
May 16 – Cap Peterson, 37, outfielder who played from 1962 to 1969 for the San Francisco Giants, Washington Senators and Cleveland Indians.
May 21 – Frank Croucher, 65, infielder for the Detroit Tigers and Washington Senators in the 1930s and 1940s.
May 25 – Jesse Brown, 65, left-hander who pitched in the Negro National League between 1938 and 1944.

June
June 1 – Rube Marquard, 93, Hall of Fame pitcher who retired with 201 wins and the NL record for career strikeouts by a left-hander (1593); had 19 consecutive wins for the Giants in 1912 for a modern major league record.
June 3 – Fred Lieb, 92, sportswriter who covered every World Series from 1911 to 1958.
June 5 – Jimmie Keenan, 81, left-hander who pitched in 16 total games for the 1920–1921 Philadelphia Phillies.
June 9 – Odell Hale, 71, infielder for the Cleveland Indians in the 1930s, who hit .300 three times and collected two 100-RBI seasons.
June 11 – Rube Marshall, 89, pitcher who hurled in 64 games for the 1912–1914 Philadelphia Phillies, then made 21 mound appearances for the 1915 Buffalo Blues of the "outlaw" Federal League. 
June 12 – Dan Thomas, 29, outfielder for the Milwaukee Brewers from 1976 to 1977.
June 14 – Johnny Hodapp, 74, second baseman and third baseman in 791 games for the Cleveland Indians (1925–1932), Chicago White Sox (1932) and Boston Red Sox (1933); led AL in hits (225) and doubles (51) in 1930.
June 25 – Joe Muir, 57, southpaw who pitched in 21 games for the 1951–1952 Pittsburgh Pirates.
June – Henry Spearman, 70, third baseman who appeared for six Negro National League clubs, notably the Philadelphia Stars and Homestead Grays, between 1936 and 1945, and batted .302 lifetime.

July
July 1 – Curt Coleman, 93, third baseman who played in 12 games for the New York Highlanders during the early weeks of the 1912 campaign.
July 4 – Jack Martin, 93, shortstop who played from 1912 to 1914 for the Highlanders, Boston Braves and Philadelphia Phillies.
July 5 – Ben Tincup, 87, member of original and modern Cherokee Nation and pitcher in pro ball for 27 seasons spanning 1912 to 1942, including 48 MLB games for Phillies (1914–1915, 1918) and Chicago Cubs (1928); coach for 1940 Brooklyn Dodgers and longtime instructor and scout.
July 6 – Walt Craddock, 48, left-handed hurler who went 0–7 (6.49 ERA) in 29 appearances for the Kansas City Athletics (1955–1956, 1958).
July 8 – Wenty Ford, 33, Bahamian pitcher who appeared in four games for the 1973 Atlanta Braves.
July 16 – Ernie Vick, 80, catcher in 57 career games for the St. Louis Cardinals (1922, 1924–1926); reserve with 1926 World Series champion Redbirds.
July 23 – Wally Snell, 91, catcher for the 1913 Boston Red Sox, who later went on to a distinguished career as a college botany professor and athletic coach at Brown University for four decades.
July 30 – Joe Lucey, 83, pitcher/infielder who played 13 games for the New York Yankees and Boston Red Sox between 1920 and 1925.

August
August 1 – Bill McKinley, 70, American League umpire from 1946 to 1965 who officiated in 2,976 regular-season games, plus four World Series and three All-Star games.
August 3 – Bill Hubbell, 83, pitcher who appeared in 204 games between 1919 and 1925 for three NL clubs, principally the Phillies.
August 4 – Lefty Jamerson, 80, pitcher for the 1924 Boston Red Sox.
August 8 – Allan Collamore, 93, pitcher who worked in 40 total games for Philadelphia (1911) and Cleveland (1914–1915) of the American League.
August 8 – Henry Henderson, 75, first baseman for the 1932 Nashville Elite Giants of the Negro Southern League.
August 13 – Tom Miller, 83, outfielder by trade who pinch hit in nine MLB games for the 1918–1919 Boston Braves.
August 17 – Jonah Goldman, 73, shortstop/third baseman in 148 total games for the Cleveland Indians (1928, 1930–1931).
August 20 – Al Hermann, 81, outfielder who played in 32 games for the Boston Braves in 1923 and 1924.
August 22 – Columbus Vance, 75, pitcher and occasional outfielder who appeared in the Negro leagues between 1927 and 1933.
August 24 – Herman Fink, 69, pitcher who fashioned a 10–20 (5.22) career record in 67 games for the 1935–1937 Philadelphia Athletics.
August 27 – John Wilson, 77, pitched briefly for the Red Sox from 1927 to 1928.
August 28 – Harry Smythe, 75, left-handed pitcher who worked in 60 total games for the Philadelphia Phillies (1929–1930), New York Yankees (1934) and Brooklyn Dodgers (1934); pitched in pro baseball for 22 seasons.

September
September 1 – Hank LaManna, 61, pitcher/outfielder who appeared in 45 career contests for Boston of the National League from 1940 to 1942.
September 6 – Gus Ketchum, 83, pitched in six games for the 1922 Philadelphia Athletics.
September 10 – Honey Lott, 55, outfielder/second baseman for the 1948 New York Black Yankees of the Negro National League.
September 11 – Junius Bibbs, 69, infielder who played in the Negro leagues between 1933 and 1944, then became a biology teacher and athletics coach in Indianapolis for 25 years; member, Indiana Baseball Hall of Fame.
September 11 – Garth Mann, 64, pitcher whose 12-year professional baseball career included one MLB game as a pinch runner for the Chicago Cubs on May 14, 1944.
September 12 – Ole Olsen, 86, Cornell University graduate and World War I veteran who pitched in 54 games for the 1922–1923 Detroit Tigers.
September 13 – Charlie Pechous, 83, third baseman who played in 53 games for the 1915 Chicago Whales (Federal League) and 1916–1917 Chicago Cubs. 
September 18 – Fredda Acker, 54, All-American Girls Professional Baseball League player, who was named Mrs. America in 1947.
September 18 – Leo Tankersley, 79, catcher who played a single MLB game on July 2, 1925 as a member of the Chicago White Sox.
September 22 – Tommy Neill, 60, outfielder and pinch hitter who played 20 games for 1946–1947 Boston Braves.
September 24 – Bill Ayers, 60, pitcher who appeared in 13 games for the New York Giants between April and July 1947.
September 24 – Ernie Shore, 89, pitcher for New York Giants (1912), Boston Red Sox (1914–1917) and New York Yankees (1919–1920) whose career was curtailed by World War I military service; on June 23, 1917, he relieved Babe Ruth, ejected by the umpires, with a man on first and none out in the first inning, and proceeded to retire the runner and all 26 remaining batters.
September – Mack Eggleston, 83 or 84, catcher/outfielder/third baseman who played in the Negro leagues and appeared in 509 games between 1920 and 1934.
September – Walter Hardy, 54, shortstop who played in the Negro leagues between 1944 and 1950; later, a business partner of Roy Campanella.

October
October 1 – Pat Veltman, 74, utility player who played for four MLB teams over six seasons spanning 1926 to 1934.
October 8 – Lloyd Johnson, 69, Pittsburgh Pirates' left-hander who hurled one inning of scoreless relief in his only MLB appearance on April 21, 1934.
October 27 – Frank Loftus, 82, pitcher who worked one inning of one MLB game on September 26, 1926, for the Washington Senators against the Chicago White Sox.

November
November 6 – Leroy Morney, 71, All-Star shortstop who played for 11 Negro leagues teams between 1932 and 1944; batting champion (.378) of the 1932 Negro Southern League.
November 8 – Dale Jones, 61, pitcher who appeared in two games for 1941 Philadelphia Phillies.
November 17 – Eppie Barnes, 79, first baseman and pinch hitter in four games for 1923–1924 Pittsburgh Pirates.
November 17 – Hersh Martin, 71, outfielder who played in 607 games for the 1937–1940 Philadelphia Phillies and 1944–1945 New York Yankees; 1938 National League All-Star.
November 19 – Jack Gilligan, 95, pitcher in 12 games for 1909–1910 St. Louis Browns.
November 25 – Art Jones, 74, pitcher who appeared in one MLB game and one inning for the Brooklyn Dodgers on April 23, 1932.
November 27 – "Wild Bill" Connelly, 55, pitcher who appeared in 25 career games for four clubs, notably the New York Giants, between 1945 and 1953.
November 29 – Bill Dunlap, 71, outfielder for the Boston Braves from 1929 to 1930.

December
December 2 – Don Padgett, 68, catcher/outfielder who appeared in 699 career games for the St. Louis Cardinals, Brooklyn Dodgers, Boston Braves and Philadelphia Phillies between 1937 and 1948, missing four full years while serving in World War II; batted .399 in 233 at bats for 1939 Cardinals. 
December 4 – Georgette Vincent, 52. who pitched for two All-American Girls Professional Baseball League champion teams spanning 1951–1952.
December 7 – Lennie Pearson, 62, six-time Negro National League All-Star outfielder/first baseman who spent almost all of his career with the Newark Eagles (1937–1948); 1942 NNL Triple-Crown winner and member of 1946 Negro World Series championship team.
December 7 – Luke Urban, 93, catcher/pinch hitter who was 40 years old when he made his rookie MLB debut; appeared in 50 total games for the 1927–1928 Boston Braves.
December 9 – Ted Olson, 68, Dartmouth graduate who pitched in 18 games for the 1936–1938 Boston Red Sox.
December 10 – Rosy Ryan, 82, key pitcher on pennant-winning New York Giants teams of early 1920s; led National League in ERA in 1922 and games pitched in 1923, and won World Series rings in 1921–1922; later, a longtime minor league executive.
December 14 – Elston Howard, 51, twelve-time All-Star catcher for the New York Yankees from 1955 to August 3, 1967, who was that team's first black player; 1963 American League MVP and two-time Gold Glove winner; also coached for Yanks from 1969 to 1979 and won six World Series rings between 1956 and 1978; Yankees posthumously retired his #32 uniform in 1984; finished playing career with the Red Sox, helping them win 1967 AL pennant.
December 20 – Mike Knode, 80, outfielder/second baseman who played 42 games for 1942 St. Louis Cardinals who previously starred in football for the University of Michigan; elder brother of Ray Knode.
December 22 – Earl Grace, 73, left-handed-hitting catcher who appeared in 627 career games for Chicago Cubs (1929, 1931), Pittsburgh Pirates (1931–1935) and Philadelphia Phillies (1936–1937).
December 26 – Bill Crouch, 73, pitcher who twirled in 50 MLB games for the 1939 Brooklyn Dodgers, 1941 Philadelphia Phillies, and 1941 and 1945 St. Louis Cardinals.
December 26 – Johnny Oulliber, 69, outfielder for 1933 Cleveland Indians, appearing in 22 games.
December 30 – Stuffy Stewart, 86, reserve second baseman and utility player in 176 games for eight seasons for four teams, notably the Washington Senators, between 1916 and 1929.
December 31 – Jim Britt, 70, play-by-announcer for the Boston Braves (1940–1952) and Red Sox (1940–1950), Cleveland Indians (1954–1957), and the Mutual Radio Network.
December 31 – Bob Shawkey, 90, pitcher who had four 20-win seasons for the New York Yankees between 1916 and 1922 and won 195 MLB games overall; led AL in ERA (2.45) in 1920; managed Yankees for 1930 season, essentially between terms of Hall of Fame pilots Miller Huggins and Joe McCarthy; later, head baseball coach at Dartmouth College (1952–1956).